"What the Footman Saw" was the tenth episode of the third series of the British television series, Upstairs, Downstairs. The episode is set in 1913.

Cast
 Colonel Harry Tewksbury  (Bernard Archard )
 Lord Charles Gilmour  (Anthony Ainley )
 Gilmour's footman Joseph (Tony Bateman)
 Trumper  (Walter Horsbrugh)
 Clough  (Thomas Heathcote)
 Robert  (Robin Sachs)
 John  (David Goodland )
 Dillon's Clerk  (Frank Tregear )

Plot
Edward Barnes goes as James Bellamy's footman for a weekend visit to Somerby, the country house of James' school-friend Lord "Bunny" Newbury. During his visit to Somerby Edward sees Lord Gilmour and Lady Tewkesbury together. In Eaton Place he claims that he saw Gilmour and the married Lady Tewkesbury sleeping together. That leads to the scandalous divorce case of Lord and Lady Tewkesbury.

References 

Upstairs, Downstairs (series 3) episodes
1973 British television episodes
Fiction set in 1913